Family of Love may refer to:
 Familia Caritatis, a mystic religious community in renaissance England and the Low Countries
 Family International, a new religious movement, which used the name Family of Love
 The Family of Love (play), an early Jacobean stage play, first published in 1608
 Family of Love (EP), a 2011 EP by Dom